Faidon Matthaiou, (alternate spellings: Feidon, Fedon, Mathaiou, Mattheou; : 12 July 1924 – 17 September 2011) was a Greek professional basketball player and coach. He was a center at the start of his career, and at the end of his career, he also played as a point guard. He wore the number 1 jersey throughout his career. He represented Greece twice at the Summer Olympics. As a rower at the 1948 Summer Olympics, and as a basketball player at the 1952 Summer Olympics.

Faidon Matthaiou is widely considered to be the Patriarch of Greek basketball.

Professional playing career

Born in Thessaloniki, Matthaiou began playing professional basketball, as well as many other sports, with Aris in 1945. His father was Manthos Matthaiou, president of Aris Thessaloniki, who was killed in 1941 during Italian air bombings of Thessaloniki during the Greco-Italian War. In 1949, he transferred to Panathinaikos. He also played with Panionios, the Italian League club Pallacanestro Varese, and Sporting.

With Panathinaikos, he won 3 Greek League championships, in the years 1950, 1951, and 1954. He also played at the International Cup Tournament (the forerunner of the EuroLeague) in 1955 at the Viareggio Tournament, where he was the leading scorer and MVP.

National team playing career
Matthaiou played for the Greece men's national basketball team, as one of its leading members for 44 games, and he scored a total of 539 points (12.25 points per game). He also played in the very first official game of the Greece men's national basketball team, which was played at the FIBA EuroBasket 1949. He was the team's leading scorer at that tournament with 66 points, while the Greece men's national basketball team also won the tournament's bronze medal. He participated as a player in 2 FIBA EuroBasket tournaments, the FIBA EuroBasket 1949 and the FIBA EuroBasket 1951, and also in the 1952 Olympic Basketball Tournament.

Coaching career
After his playing career ended, Matthaiou coached the Greece men's national basketball team at three FIBA EuroBasket tournaments, the FIBA EuroBasket 1961, the FIBA EuroBasket 1965, and the FIBA EuroBasket 1969. He also coached professional sport clubs of the Greek League, such as Olympiacos, AEK, PAOK and Peristeri. He also coached the Italian League clubs Storm Varèse and Virtus Roma.

He was also named as a coach of the FIBA European Selection team in the years 1970 and 1973. He also won both the Greek Cup and the Greek League championship with Olympiacos in 1976, and the Greek Cup with PAOK in 1984.

Awards and accomplishments

Playing career

Clubs
3× Greek League Champion: (1950, 1951, 1954)
Viareggio International Cup Tournament Top Scorer: (1955)
Viareggio International Cup Tournament MVP: (1955)

Greece national team
FIBA EuroBasket 1949: 
1955 Mediterranean Games:

Head coaching career

Clubs
2× FIBA European Selection: (1970, 1973)
2× Greek Cup Winner: (1976, 1984)
Greek League Champion: (1976)

References

External links
FIBA.com Profile (archive)

Hall of Game.gr Profile
The top of the Greek bench: Faidon Matthaiou 
Hellenic Federation Profile 

1924 births
2011 deaths
AEK B.C. coaches
Aris B.C. coaches
Aris B.C. players
Basketball players at the 1952 Summer Olympics
Centers (basketball)
Basketball players at the 1955 Mediterranean Games
Greece national basketball team coaches
Greek basketball coaches
Greek Basket League players
Greek male rowers
Greek men's basketball players
Mediterranean Games bronze medalists for Greece
Olympiacos B.C. coaches
Olympic basketball players of Greece
Pallacanestro Varese coaches
Pallacanestro Varese players
Panathinaikos B.C. players
Panionios B.C. players
P.A.O.K. BC coaches
Basketball players from Thessaloniki
Peristeri B.C. coaches
Point guards
Olympic rowers of Greece
Rowers at the 1948 Summer Olympics
Sporting basketball players
Mediterranean Games medalists in basketball